Khamr is an Arabic word for wine; intoxication; the plural form, Khumūr, is defined as alcoholic beverages, wine; liquor. In fiqh, it refers to certain forbidden substances, and its technical definition depends on the madhhab or legal school. Most jurists, including those from the Maliki, Shafiʽi, Hanbali, Ahl-i Hadith legal schools have traditionally viewed it as general term for any intoxicating beverage made from grapes, dates, and similar substances. Hanafi jurists restricted the term to a narrower range of beverages. Over time, some jurists classified other intoxicants, such as opium and khat, as khamr, based on a hadith stating, "The Holy Prophet said: 'every intoxicant is khamr, and every intoxicant is forbidden.'"

Traditions of Muhammad indicated that khamr may be made from two plants, the grapevine and the date palm.

There are some faqīhs, particularly of the Hanafi school, who take the concept of khamr literally and forbid only grape-based (or date-based) alcoholic beverages, allowing those made with other fruits, grains, or honey. This is, however, a minority opinion.

Islamic countries have low rates of alcohol consumption. However, a minority of Muslims do drink and believe consuming alcohol is not Qur'anically forbidden. Muslim-majority countries produce a variety of regional distilled beverages such as arrack and rakı. There is a long tradition of viticulture in the Middle East, particularly in Egypt (where it is legal) and in Iran (where it is banned).

Scriptural basis
Quranic verses that at least discourage alcohol include

According to a hadith where Imam Ahmad recorded what Abu Maysarah said, the verses came after requests by `Umar to Allah, to "Give us a clear ruling regarding Al-Khamr!" Many Muslims believe the verses were revealed over time in this order to gradually nudge Muslim converts away from drunkenness and towards total sobriety, as to ban alcohol abruptly would have been too harsh and impractical.

Punishment
The Quran does not prescribe a penalty for consuming alcohol. 

Among hadith, the only reference for punishment comes from one by Anas ibn Malik, (according to Murtaza Haider of Dawn.com in Pakistan) who is reported to have stated that Muhammad prescribed 40 lashes "administered with two palm branches ... for someone accused of consuming alcohol".   Saudi Arabian scholar Saalih al-Munajjid also states that a hadith report narrated by Sahih Muslim (3281) from Anas  reports that Muhammad flogged someone who had drunk wine with palm branches stripped of their leaves and with shoes.

Interpretation

All alcohol or only wine debate
Like the rationalist school of Islamic theology, the Muʿtazila, early Hanafi scholars upheld the unlawfulness of intoxication, but restricted its definition to fermented juice of grapes or grapes and dates. As a result, alcohol derived by means of honey, barley, wheat and millet such as  beer, whisky or vodka was permitted according to Abu Hanifa and Abu Yusuf, although all forms of grape alcohol were banned absolutely. This was in stark contrast to other schools of fiqh, which prohibit consumption of alcohol in all its forms, though Hanafis traced their view on intoxicants back to Umar (d.644) and Abdullah ibn Masud (c.653),

Averroes, the Muslim Andalusi polymath and jurist, explained it thus in his encyclopedia of comparative Islamic jurisprudence,

This distinction between the legal status of wine and non-grape alcoholic beverages was reflected in early Hanafi legal doctrine. Hanafi jurists delineated drinking-related offences into two categories:
 Drinking grape-derived wine (punishment applicable on drinking "even a drop").
 Intoxication from non-grape intoxicants (certainly prohibited from a religious-moral perspective, but may or may not qualify for criminal punishment).
As the second category of punishment was specific to the Hanafis (other schools punish drinking regardless of intoxication), they had to come with a legal definition of drunkenness. These definitions ranged from Ibn Qutaybah's, "[a drunk is he] whose intellect has left him so he does not understand a little or much (anything at all)" to Ibn Nujaym’s ,"[a drunk is he who] does not know (the difference) between a man and a woman or the earth from the sky". Hanafi understanding of Shariah not only permitted adherents to indulge in alcoholic beverages but they could do so up to a near point of total "annihilation".

However, from the 12th century, the Hanafi school embraced the general prohibition of all alcoholic prohibitions, in line with the other schools.

Alcohol derived from honey, wheat, barley or corn is haram when used as an intoxicant, in an amount that intoxicates. But, if not used in any such manner, and intended to use for medical purpose, hygiene, perfume, etc., then it would be permissible.

Of punishment
According to scholar Muhammad Al-Munajjid of Saudi Arabia, the consensus of classical fuqaha’ for the punishment for consumption of alcohol is flogging, but scholars differ as to the number of lashes to be administered to the drinker, "the majority of scholars are of the view that it is eighty lashes for a free man" and forty for slaves and women. A man convicted of consuming alcohol was given 80 lashes in a public square in the Iranian city of Kashmar on 10 July 2018. In Pakistan the penal code, under "the Prohibition (Enforcement of Hadd) Order of 1979, awards 80 lashes to those convicted of consuming alcohol". 
In Saudi Arabia lashes "can also be part of the sentence" for consuming alcohol, according to the British Embassy.  However, according to Murtaza Haider of Dawn.com in Pakistan, "a consensus (ijmāʿ) on how to deal with alcohol has eluded Muslim jurists for more than a  millennium". The "Maliki, Hanbali, and Hanafi schools" of Islamic jurisprudence consider 80 lashes to be lawful punishment,  the Shafi’i school calls for 40 lashes. "The Hadith does not cover the matter in sufficient detail. ... Is it 40 or 80 lashes? Can one substitute palm branches with a cane or leather whips? What constitutes as proof for consumption?"

UAE Residents can drink alcohol at home and in licensed venues. Liquor licences are still required for Residents in Dubai but are no longer required for Residents in Abu Dhabi and other Emirates (save for Emirate of Sharjah) to purchase alcohol for personal consumption.

See also

References

Notes

Citations

Islamic terminology
Arabic words and phrases in Sharia
Religion and alcohol